
The denomination 322 BC for this year has been used since the early medieval period, when the Anno Domini calendar era became the prevalent method in Europe for naming years.

In the pre-Julian Roman calendar, it was known as the Year of the Consulship of Rullianus and Curvus.

Events 
 By place 

 Greece 
 Spring/summer – The Macedonian admiral Cleitus the White defeats the Athenian navy at the Battle of the Echinades and the Battle of Amorgos, ending Athenian thalassocracy in the Aegean.
 The Athenians and their allies' siege of the Macedonian ruler, Antipater, in Lamia is relieved by Leonnatus with an army of 20,000 infantry and 1,500 cavalry. Leonnatus is killed in the action.
 September 5 – Craterus arrives to defeat the Athenians in the Battle of Crannon. This battle marks a complete victory for Antipater in the Lamian War.
 The Athenian orator and diplomat, Demades, regains his citizenship so that he and Phocion can negotiate a peace with Antipater, thus concluding the Lamian War. Before setting out he persuades the citizens of Athens to pass the death sentence upon Demosthenes and his followers (including Hypereides, leader of the Athenian patriotic party). Demades' embassy results in a peace disadvantageous to the Athenians, with the Athenians forced to accept the occupation of Athens' port, Piraeus, by the Macedonians.
 Demosthenes flees from the Macedonians who demand his surrender. Upon being arrested, he takes poison and dies.
 Hypereides flees to Aegina only to be captured by the Macedonians at the temple of Poseidon and put to death.
 The League of Corinth is dissolved.

 Egypt 
 By custom, kings in Macedonia assert their right to the throne by burying their predecessor. To pre-empt Perdiccas, the imperial regent, Ptolemy has Alexander the Great's body brought to Memphis, Egypt and buried there in a gold sarcophagus. Ptolemy then marries Alexander's mistress, Thaïs and commences to reign as king of Egypt and the adjacent Libyan and Arabian regions.
 Ptolemy, taking advantage of internal disturbances, acquires the African Hellenic towns of Cyrenaica without the authority of Perdiccas.
 Ptolemy executes his deputy, Cleomenes of Naucratis, on the suspicion that Cleomenes favours Perdiccas. This action removes the chief check on his authority, and allows Ptolemy to obtain the sizable funds that Cleomenes has accumulated.

 India 
 Chandragupta Maurya captures Magadha: Chandragupta, with the help of Chanakya (Kautilya), who is also known as the Indian Machiavelli, destroys the Nanda rulers of Magadha and establishes the Maurya Empire. It is said that Chanakya met Chandragupta in the Vindhya forest, after being insulted by the Nanda king.

Births

Deaths 
 October 12 – Demosthenes, Athenian statesman, recognized as the greatest of ancient Greek orators (b. 384 BC)
 Ariarathes I of Cappadocia, Achaemenid satrap, founder of the Iranian Ariarathid dynasty
 Aristotle, Greek philosopher and scientist (b. 384 BC)
 Cleomenes of Naucratis, Greek deputy to the Macedonian ruler of Egypt, Ptolemy
 Hypereides, Athenian orator (b. 390 BC)
 Leonnatus, Macedonian officer under Alexander the Great and one of the diadochi (b. 356 BC)

References